Deh-e Guyieh (also Romanized as Deh-e Gūyīeh) is a village in Garmsar Rural District, Jebalbarez-e Jonubi District, Anbarabad County, Kerman Province, Iran. At the 2006 census, its population was 53, in 14 families.

References 

Populated places in Anbarabad County